AR Rahman Foundation is a non-profit organization registered under FCRA. It was started in 2009 by Indian musician A R Rahman to raise funds for disaster relief and to provide education for poor children in India. Khatija Rahman is the director of this foundation.

Projects 

 Sunshine Orchestra

References

External links
https://web.archive.org/web/20090925105051/http://www.arrahman.com/v2/foundation-vision.html

Foundations based in India
Social welfare charities
Organizations established in 2009
2009 establishments in India
Non-profit organisations based in India